Rodnaya Zemlya ( - 'Native Land') was a weekly newspaper occupying a position close to that of the Trudoviks; published in St. Petersburg, Russia, from January until April 1907.

References

Newspapers published in the Russian Empire
Mass media in Saint Petersburg